Alphonzo Edward Bell could refer to: 

Alphonzo Bell (1875–1947), American businessman
Alphonzo Edward Bell Jr. (1914–2004), American politician and son of Alphonzo Bell